MTV Party To Go Volume 6 was the sixth album in the MTV Party To Go series.  The album was certified gold on January 30, 1995 by the RIAA.

Track listing
 "Move It Like This" (Extended Mix) – K7
 "Fantastic Voyage" (Timber Mix) – Coolio
 "Cantaloop (Flip Fantasia)" (Ultimix) – US3
 "100% Pure Love" (Club Mix) – Crystal Waters
 "Can We Talk" – Tevin Campbell
 "Your Body's Callin'" – R. Kelly
 "Getto Jam" – Domino
 "Regulate" – Warren G
 "All That She Wants" (Extended Mix) – Ace of Base
 "Back & Forth" (Mr. Lee's Club Mix) – Aaliyah
 "Shoop" (Ghetto Lab Full Rub Mix) – Salt-N-Pepa
 "Award Tour" (Extended Mix) – A Tribe Called Quest
 "I Swear" – All-4-One

Charts

Weekly charts

Year-end charts

References

MTV series albums
1994 compilation albums
Tommy Boy Records compilation albums
Dance-pop compilation albums